Outback Opal Hunters is an Australian factual television show which follows opal miners across various sites in the Australian states of New South Wales, Queensland, South Australia and Western Australia. The series is produced by Prospero Productions and began on the Discovery Channel on 8 February 2018. The series has been a ratings success and has been broadcast in over 100 countries including the United Kingdom and United States.

The eighth season concluded on 12 May 2022.

Premise
The series follows opal miners in various locations of Australia as they strive to reach their individually set season target (measured in Australian dollars).

Production 
In August 2017 it was announced Discovery had commissioned Outback Opal Hunters, a factual series from Prospero Productions which follows opal miners across New South Wales (NSW), Queensland (QLD) and Coober Pedy, South Australia (SA). The eight episode first season premiered on 8 February 2018. In September 2018 it was announced the series had been renewed for a 13 episode second season which would expand into Western Australia (WA). The second season which was filmed in Lightning Ridge (NSW), Opalton (QLD), Coober Pedy (SA) and Laverton (WA) premiered on 31 January 2019. The third season consisting of eight episodes was filmed across Lightning Ridge (NSW), Opalton (QLD), Laverton (WA), White Cliffs (NSW), Sheepyard (NSW) and Mintabie (SA). The season premiered on 17 October 2019. Season four which consisted of 12 episodes premiered on 6 February 2020. The fifth season premiered on 8 October 2020. In December 2020 it was initially reported as part of Foxtel's 2021 Upfronts the series would return for its sixth season on 11 February 2021. However, the season in fact premiered a week earlier on 4 February 2021. The seventh season premiered on 7 October 2021. The 12 episode eighth season premiered on 24 February 2022.

Cast

Episodes

Series overview

Season 1 (2018)

Season 2 (2019)

Season 3 (2019)

Season 4 (2020)

Season 5 (2020)

Season 6 (2021)

Season 7 (2021)

Season 8 (2022)

Broadcast
As of May 2020 the series has been broadcast in over 100 countries including in the United Kingdom on Quest and in the United States on Discovery Channel.

Reception

Ratings
The series has been a domestic and international ratings success. Executive Producer Darren Chau speaking with Mediaweek in May 2020 said "Aussie Gold Hunters has been the #1 factual series on Foxtel for the last three successive years. Outback Opal Hunters is right behind it." Additionally he said in the United Kingdom "Outback Opal Hunters is top five on Quest", and in the United States it airs on the Discovery Channel where it premiered in November 2019 "so successful they immediately rolled into season two" and it airs "on the channel’s biggest night of the week".

Accolades
The series was nominated for Best Documentary Series at the Screen Producers Australia Awards in 2018.

See also

Australian resource extraction television
 Aussie Gold Hunters
 Aussie Lobster Men
Gemstone mining television
 Jade Fever, jade extraction in Canada

References

External links

Australian factual television series
2018 Australian television series debuts
English-language television shows
Television shows set in the Outback
Discovery Channel original programming
Opals